Nordic combined at the 1956 Winter Olympics consisted of one event, held from 29 January to 31 January. The ski jumping portion took place at Trampolino Olimpico, while the cross-country portion took place at Lo Stadio della neve.

Standings were determined by the combined length of 3 jumps per entrant and combined style points (best 2 out of 3), awarded by a pool of 5 international judges.

Medal summary

Medal table

Franciszek Gąsienica Groń's bronze medal was the first, and as of 2010, only, medal for Poland in nordic combined.

Events

Individual
Athletes did three normal hill ski jumps, with the lowest score dropped. They then raced a 15 kilometre cross-country course, with the time converted to points. The athlete with the highest combined points score was awarded the gold medal.

Participating NOCs
Twelve nations participated in nordic combined at the Cortina Games. The Soviet Union made their Olympic nordic combined debut.

References

External links
 Sports-Reference - 1956 Olympics - Nordic Combined - Individual

 
1956 Winter Olympics events
1956
1956 in Nordic combined
Nordic combined competitions in Italy
Men's events at the 1956 Winter Olympics